The Minglewood Band was a Canadian rock group from Cape Breton, Nova Scotia that was active in the 1970s and 1980s. The group received a 1980 Juno Award nomination for the Most Promising Group of the Year.

The Minglewood Band was founded in the late 1960s by guitarist/vocalist Matt Minglewood, with bassist/vocalist Donnie Hann, percussionist Bob Woods, guitarist Mark MacMillan, and vocalist Paul Dunn. Vocalist Enver Sampson Jr. joined the group in the early 1970s. The Minglewood Band independently released their self-titled debut album in 1976. The group was signed by RCA Records in 1979, but in 1982 they shortened their name to just Minglewood and switched labels to Columbia Records. At this same time guitarist Mark McMillan left the group and was replaced by George Antoniak.

Discography
The Minglewood Band (Independent, 1976)
The Minglewood Band (RCA, 1979)
Moving (1980)
Out on a Limb (1981)
Smokers: Best of The Minglewood Band (1982)
M5 (1983)
Me And the Boys (1985) (Matt Minglewood solo album)
The Best of the Minglewood Band (1992)

Singles

References

External links

Canadian rock music groups
Musical groups disestablished in 1986
Musical groups established in 1969